Stanisław Gawlik  (November 11, 1925 – February 2, 1990) was a Polish actor. He made over 20 appearances in film and television. He starred in the 1978 comedy film What Will You Do When You Catch Me?.

References

External links

1925 births
1990 deaths
Polish male film actors
20th-century Polish male actors